The Endotheniini are a tribe of tortrix moths.

Genera
Endothenia
Hulda
Saliciphaga
Taniva
Tia

References